Charles Alexander Pasternak (born March 1930) is a British scientist. Educated at Oxford University, he then spent two years at Yale University Medical School. He spent the next 16 years at the Department of Biochemistry, University of Oxford, with a Tutorial Fellowship at Worcester College. In 1976, he took up the Foundation Chair of Biochemistry at St George’s Hospital Medical School, University of London.

Commissioned into the Royal Artillery in 1953, he spent 12 years in the Territorial Army in the Oxford & Bucks Light Infantry, and later the Royal Green Jackets, retiring with the rank of Major.

In 1992, Pasternak founded the Oxford International Biomedical Centre and is currently President.

He has sat on many international editorial boards (Founder-Editor of Bioscience Reports) and advisory committees (including UNESCO, Chulabhorn Research Institute, Bangkok and Antenna Technologies, Geneva). He has an Hon MD from the Medical University of Bucharest and is a Foreign Member of the Polish Academy of Arts and Sciences.

Pasternak is the nephew of writer and poet Boris Pasternak and the father of writer Anna Pasternak.

References

British biochemists
Academics of St George's, University of London
Alumni of the University of Oxford
Living people
1930 births